Paul Crauchet (14 July 1920 – 19 December 2012) was a French actor.

Biography
As a young man interested in aviation and rugby, Paul Crauchet discovered a passion for the theatre at the age of 23. He settled in Paris in 1945, he studied under Charles Dullin for three years and began on stage in 1949. He then worked at the Théâtre National Populaire with Jean Vilar.
 
Crauchet appeared in the first film by Éric Rohmer, The Sign of Leo, in 1959, and then in 1962 in The War of the Buttons of Yves Robert. It is in The Wise Guys  of Robert Enrico in 1965 that he became noticed. He had a very long career during which he worked with many directors, such as Alain Resnais, René Clément, Jean-Pierre Melville, Jacques Deray and José Giovanni. In 1983 he starred in Les Bancals.

Filmography

References

External links

1920 births
2012 deaths
French male film actors
French male stage actors
People from Béziers